Metropolitan Entertainment Television is a Ghanaian free-to-air television channel. It was launched in 1997 and it is the second largest television network in the country.

Metro TV is a member of the Ignite Media Group, a part of the Jospong Group of Companies (JGC) which also contains Original TV and Original 91.9FM.

Launch of new premises 
In October 2020, a new office which is located in North Ridge, was commissioned by the President, Nana Akufo-Addo. It is a four floor building that has space for offices and houses six (6) fully furnished studios.

References

Television stations in Ghana
Mass media in Accra